The 2022 Queensland Cup season was the 27th season of Queensland's top-level statewide rugby league competition run by the Queensland Rugby League. The competition, known as the Hostplus Cup due to sponsorship, featured 14 teams playing a 24-week long season (including finals) from March to September.

It is the first season played under Hostplus sponsorship, after 11 seasons known as the Intrust Super Cup.

Norths Devils won their second consecutive grand final, defeating the Redcliffe Dolphins 16–10 to take their third Queensland Cup premiership.

Teams 
In 2022, the line-up of teams remained unchanged for the eighth consecutive season. Due to the COVID-19 pandemic, the PNG Hunters were based out of the Gold Coast for the second consecutive season, playing their home games at Runaway Bay's Bycroft Oval. The Hunters were able eventually to return to Port Moresby to play their final match of the season at the National Football Stadium.

Regular season 
 Fixtures & Results

Ladder

Final series

Grand Final

First half

Second half

QRL awards 
 Petero Civoniceva Medal (Best and Fairest): Taine Tuaupiki ( Burleigh Bears)
 Coach of the Year: Lionel Harbin ( Central Queensland Capras)
 Rookie of the Year: Taine Tuaupiki ( Burleigh Bears)

Team of the Year

See also 

 Queensland Cup
 Queensland Rugby League

References 

2022 in Australian rugby league
Queensland Cup